Haji Mohammad Alam Channa (1953 or 1956 – 2 July 1998) was a Pakistani farmer who was one of the tallest living people with the height of . According to the Guinness Book of World Records, the tallest living man in the world (between 1982 and 1998), was Pakistan's Mohammad Alam Channa.

Born in 1953 in the city of Sehwan (in Pakistan's Sindh province), Alam Channa is said to have stood 6 ft 4 inches by the time he was 18. He continued to grow taller till he was 26.

Channa came from an impoverished Sindhi family. He did not receive any noteworthy education. The male members of his family had traditionally served as minor retainers at the famous shrine of Sufi saint, Lal Shahbaz Qalandar, in Shewan. Here is where Channa too spent most of his years, tasked to keep certain areas of the shrine clean. According to Channa's paternal side of the family, Channa was making just Rs. 15 a week at the shrine. So when the circus offered him Rs. 160 a month, he decided to immediately accept the offer.

The circus turned Channa into a local star. He would travel with it across the length and breadth of Sindh. All he had to do was to make an entry just when two short men dressed as jokers were going through their routine. He would walk in and proceed to lift up the jokers (who would pretend to run away from the giant). Channa would grab them and then put them on his shoulders.

In 1981 a man who had watched Channa at the circus wrote a letter to the editors of the famous Guinness Book of World Records. With the letter he also sent some photos of Channa he had taken at the circus.

Months later some officials from Guinness landed in Sindh's capital city, Karachi, and from there they reached Sehwan where they met and measured Channa. They measured him at being 7 ft 8 inches. On their return to the UK, the men entered Channa's name in the Guinness book as the tallest living human on earth.

He suffered from kidney failure and high blood pressure. The government decided to send him to the US and finance his treatment. He was admitted to the Westchester Medical Center in Valhalla, New York but died there on 2 July. He is buried in Sehwan.

Early life

"Channa belonged to an indigent Sindhi family. He could not get education. All his family male members had traditionally served as minor retainers at the famous shrine of Sufi saint, Lal Shahbaz Qalandar, in Sehwan. In this town Channa spent his early years and assigned to keep areas of the shrine clean. He got married in 1989 and had a son in 1990."

References

External links
"Letter from Alam Channa to Sadruddin Noorani" in the South Asian American Digital Archive (SAADA)

1953 births
1998 deaths
Sindhi people
People from Dadu District
People with gigantism
Deaths from kidney failure